The hryvnia sign (₴) is a currency symbol, used for the Ukrainian hryvnia currency since 2004.

Description
The hryvnia sign is a cursive minuscule Ukrainian Cyrillic letter He (г), or a mirrored letter S, with a double horizontal stroke, symbolising stability, similar to that used in other currency symbols such as ¥ or €. Hryvnia is abbreviated "грн" (hrn) in Ukrainian. The hryvnia sign ₴ was released in March 2004.

The specific design of the hryvnia sign was a result of a public contest held by the National Bank of Ukraine in 2003. The bank announced that it would not take any special steps of promoting the sign, but expressed expectations that the recognition and the technical possibilities of rendering the sign would follow. As soon as the sign was announced, a proposal to encode it was written. The sign is Unicode encoded as  since version 4.1 (2005).
The symbol appears in the filigree of the 1 hryvnia and the recently introduced 1,000 hryven banknote.

See also

 Ukrainian hryvnia
 Currency symbol

References

External links
 Michael Everson's Proposal to encode the HRYVNIA SIGN and CEDI SIGN in the UCS, 2004-04-23

Symbols introduced in 2004
Currencies of Ukraine
Currency symbols
Cyrillic letters with diacritics